Formal epistemology uses formal methods from decision theory, logic, probability theory and computability theory to model and reason about issues of epistemological interest. Work in this area spans several academic fields, including philosophy, computer science, economics, and statistics. The focus of formal epistemology has tended to differ somewhat from that of traditional epistemology, with topics like uncertainty, induction, and belief revision garnering more attention than the analysis of knowledge, skepticism, and issues with justification.

History
Though formally oriented epistemologists have been laboring since the emergence of formal logic and probability theory (if not earlier), only recently have they been organized under a common disciplinary title. This gain in popularity may be attributed to the organization of yearly Formal Epistemology Workshops by Branden Fitelson and Sahotra Sarkar, starting in 2004, and the PHILOG-conferences starting in 2002 (The Network for Philosophical Logic and Its Applications) organized by Vincent F. Hendricks. Carnegie Mellon University's Philosophy Department hosts an annual summer school in logic and formal epistemology. In 2010, the department founded the Center for Formal Epistemology.

Bayesian epistemology
Bayesian epistemology is an important theory in the field of formal epistemology. It has its roots in Thomas Bayes' work in the field of probability theory. It is based on the idea that beliefs are held gradually and that the strengths of the beliefs can be described as subjective probabilities. As such, they are subject to the laws of probability theory, which act as the norms of rationality. These norms can be divided into static constraints, governing the rationality of beliefs at any moment, and dynamic constraints, governing how rational agents should change their beliefs upon receiving new evidence. The most characteristic Bayesian expression of these principles is found in the form of Dutch books, which illustrate irrationality in agents through a series of bets that lead to a loss for the agent no matter which of the probabilistic events occurs. Bayesians have applied these fundamental principles to various epistemological topics but Bayesianism does not cover all topics of traditional epistemology. The problem of confirmation in the philosophy of science, for example, can be approached through the Bayesian principle of conditionalization by holding that a piece of evidence confirms a theory if it raises the likelihood that this theory is true. Various proposals have been made to define the concept of coherence in terms of probability, usually in the sense that two propositions cohere if the probability of their conjunction is higher than if they were neutrally related to each other. The Bayesian approach has also been fruitful in the field of social epistemology, for example, concerning the problem of testimony or the problem of group belief. Bayesianism still faces various theoretical objections that have not been fully solved.

Topics
Some of the topics that come under the heading of formal epistemology include:
 Ampliative inference (including inductive logic);
 Belief revision theory
 Game theory and decision theory;
 Algorithmic learning theory (computational epistemology);
 Formal approaches to paradoxes of belief and/or action;
 Formal models of epistemic states, like belief and uncertainty;
 Formal theories of coherentism and confirmation;
 Foundations of probability and statistics.

List of contemporary formal epistemologists
 Horacio Arló-Costa , Carnegie Mellon, Philosophy (Bayesian epistemology, epistemic logic, belief revision, conditionals, rational choice, normative and behavioral decision theory)
 Alexandru Baltag (dynamic-epistemic logic, probabilistic logics, belief revision etc.) 
 Luc Bovens (Bayesian epistemology, probability, etc.)
 Samir Chopra (belief revision, physics, etc.)
 Jake Chandler (Bayesian epistemology, belief revision, etc.)
 John Collins  Columbia, Philosophy (belief revision, causal decision theory)
 Franz Dietrich (collective decision-making, etc.)
 Trent Dougherty (Jeffrey's radical probabilism, semantics for modals, theories of probability)
 Igor Douven (Bayesian epistemology, etc.)
 Ellery Eells (confirmation, probability)
 Adam Elga (probabilistic reasoning, laws, etc.)
 Branden Fitelson (confirmation, logic, etc.)
 Malcolm Forster (confirmation, simplicity, causation)
 Haim Gaifman Columbia, Philosophy (foundations of probability, mathematical logic)
 Anthony Gillies (belief revision, formal semantics)
 Mario Gómez-Torrente
 Alan Hájek (foundations of probability, decision theory, etc.)
 Joseph Halpern (reasoning about knowledge and uncertainty)
 Sven Ove Hansson (risk, decision theory, belief revision, deontic logic)
 Gilbert Harman (epistemology, statistical learning theory, mind and language)
 Stephan Hartmann (Bayesian epistemology, probability, collective decision-making, etc.)
 James Hawthorne (confirmation theory, inductive logic, belief revision, nonmonotonic logic)
 Jeff Helzner Columbia, Philosophy (decision theory, rational choice)
 Vincent F. Hendricks Copenhagen and Columbia, Philosophy (epistemic logic, formal learning theory, information processing and analysis of democracy)
 Franz Huber (formal epistemology, philosophy of science, philosophical logic)
 Richard Jeffrey (probabilistic reasoning)
 James Joyce (decision theory)
 Kevin T. Kelly , Carnegie Mellon, Philosophy (computational epistemology, belief revision, etc.)
 Matthew Kotzen (formal epistemology, philosophy of science)
 Marion Ledwig (Newcomb's problem)
 Hannes Leitgeb (belief revision, probability, Bayesianism, etc.)
 Isaac Levi Columbia, Philosophy (belief revision, decision theory, probability)
 Patrick Maher (confirmation, inductive logic)
 David Miller (probability, induction, logic, Popper)
 Luca Moretti (confirmation, coherence, transmission of warrant, epistemic truth)
 Daniel Osherson (inductive logic, reasoning, vagueness)
 Rohit Parikh CUNY, Computer Science (epistemic logic, common knowledge)
 Gabriella Pigozzi (belief revision, decision theory)
 John L. Pollock (decision theory, reasoning, AI)
 Hans Rott (belief revision, nonmonotonic logic, rational choice)
 Darrell Rowbottom (foundations of probability, confirmation, philosophy of science, etc.)
 Nick Rugai (computational epistemology)
 Miriam Schoenfield (epistemology, ethics)
 Teddy Seidenfeld  Carnegie Mellon, Philosophy (statistical decision theory, probability theory, game theory)
 Wolfgang Spohn (reasoning, probability, causation, philosophy of science, etc.)
 Paul Thorn (direct inference, defeasible reasoning, induction, etc.)
 Bas Van Fraassen (imprecise credence, probability kinematics)
 Peter Vranas (confirmation, deontic logic, time travel, ethics, etc.)
 Gregory Wheeler (probability, logic)
 Roger White (confirmation, cosmology)
 Sonja Smets (Dynamic-epistemic Logic, belief revision etc.)
 Jon Williamson (Bayesianism, probability, causation)
 Timothy Williamson (knowledge, modality, logic, vagueness, etc.)
 David Wolpert (No Free Lunch theorems, i.e., Hume done rigorously; physics and inference, i.e., monotheism theorems, Chomsky hierarchy of inference devices, etc.)

See also
 Algorithmic learning theory
 Belief revision
 Computability theory
 Computational learning theory
 Game theory
 Inductive logic

References

Bibliography
Arlo-Costa, H, van Benthem, J. and Hendricks, V. F. (eds.) (2012). A Formal Epistemology Reader. Cambridge: Cambridge University Press.
Bovens, L. and Hartmann, S. (2003). Bayesian Epistemology. Oxford: Oxford University Press.
 Brown, B. (2017). Thoughts and Ways of Thinking: Source Theory and Its Applications. London: Ubiquity Press. .
Hendricks, V. F. (2001). The Convergence of Scientific Knowledge: A View from The Limit. Dordrect: Kluwer Academic Publishers.
Hendricks, V. F. (2006). Mainstream and Formal Epistemology. New York: Cambridge University Press.
Hendricks, V. F. (ed.) (2006). Special issue on “8 Bridges Between Mainstream and Formal Epistemology”, Philosophical Studies.
Hendricks, V. F. (ed.) (2006). Special issue on “Ways of Worlds I-II”, Studia Logica.
Hendricks, V.F. and Pritchard, D. (eds.) (2006). New Waves in Epistemology. Aldershot: Ashgate.
Hendricks, V. F. and Symons, J. (eds.) (2005). Formal Philosophy. New York: Automatic Press / VIP. 
Hendricks, V. F. and Symons, J. (eds.) (2006). Masses of Formal Philosophy. New York: Automatic Press / VIP. 
Hendricks, V. F. and Hansen, P.G. (eds.) (2007). Game Theory: 5 Questions. New York: Automatic Press / VIP. 
Hendricks, V.F. and Symons, J. (2006). Epistemic Logic. The Stanford Encyclopedia of Philosophy, Stanford. CA: USA.
Wolpert, D.H., (1996) The lack of a priori distinctions between learning algorithms, Neural Computation, pp. 1341–1390.
Wolpert, D.H., (1996) The existence of a priori distinctions between learning algorithms, Neural Computation, pp. 1391–1420.
Wolpert, D.H., (2001) Computational capabilities of physical systems. Physical Review E, 65(016128).
Zhu, H.Y. and R. Rohwer, (1996) No free lunch for cross-validation, pp. 1421– 1426.

External links

 
 
Formal Epistemology Workshop
Formal Epistemology Meets Experimental Philosophy Workshop
Formal Epistemology Archive
Carnegie Mellon Summer School in Logic and Formal Epistemology
Formal Philosophy
Formal Epistemology, a free online journal.
The Reasoner
Formal Epistemology Project 
Carnegie Mellon Center for Formal Epistemology
Formal Epistemology
Formal epistemology & Logics

 
Epistemology
Formalism (philosophy)
Philosophy of statistics
Probability assessment